Earthdawn Gamemaster Pack is a supplement published by FASA in 1993 for the fantasy role-playing game Earthdawn.

Contents
Earthdawn Gamemaster Pack contains:
 a 64-page booklet designed by Greg Gorden and Louis Prosperi, with illustrations by Jennell Jaquays, Jeff Laubenstein, Joel Biske, and Robert Nelson, that contains rules for non-player characters, tips for designing adventures, optional combat rules, new treasures, and an essay about blood magic. 
 a gamemaster's screen
 nine new treasure cards
 errata from the main Earthdawn rulebook

Reception
In the February 1994 edition of Dragon (Issue #202), Rick Swan was unimpressed by this supplement. He felt that the gamemaster's screen "does an adequate job collecting key tables from the rulebook, but in itself isn't worth the price of the package." Likewise, Swan didn't feel the information contained in the booklet was crucial, and thought that the errata sheet only contained one worthwhile correction.

Reviews
White Wolf Magazine #42 (April, 1994)

Notes

References

Earthdawn supplements
Role-playing game supplements introduced in 1993